Bravo is an American basic cable television network, launched on December 8, 1980. It is owned by the NBCUniversal Television and Streaming division of Comcast's NBCUniversal. The channel originally focused on programming related to fine arts and film. It currently mainly focuses on lifestyle reality television series targeted at 25-to-54-year-old women as well as the LGBTQIA+ community.

As of January 2016, approximately 89,824,000 American households (77% of households with TV) receive Bravo.

History
Bravo originally launched as a commercial-free premium channel on December 8, 1980. It was originally co-owned by Cablevision's Rainbow Media division and Warner-Amex Satellite Entertainment; the channel claimed to be "the first television service dedicated to film and the performing arts". The channel originally broadcast its programming two days a week and—like Bravo's former sister network Nickelodeon, which shared its channel space with Alpha Repertory Television Service—shared its channel space with the adult-oriented pay channel Escapade (now Playboy TV), which featured softcore pornographic films. In 1981, Bravo was available to 48,000 subscribers throughout the United States; this total increased four years later to around 350,000 subscribers. A 1985 profile of Bravo in The New York Times observed that most of its programming consisted of international, classic, and independent film. Celebrities such as E. G. Marshall and Roberta Peters provided opening and closing commentary to the films broadcast on the channel.

Performing arts programs seen on Bravo included the show Jazz Counterpoint. During the mid-1980s, Bravo converted from a premium service into a basic cable channel, although it remained a commercial-free service. Bravo signed an underwriting deal with Texaco in 1992 and within a month broadcast the first Texaco Showcase production, a stage adaptation of Romeo and Juliet. By the mid-1990s, Bravo began to incorporate more PBS-style underwriting sponsorships, and then began accepting traditional commercial advertising by 1998.

In the Encyclopedia of Television, Megan Mullen perceived certain Bravo programs as "considered too risky or eclectic for mainstream channels". Those programs were Karaoke and Cold Lazarus, the final serials by British playwright Dennis Potter shown by Bravo in June 1997, and Michael Moore's documentary series The Awful Truth from 1999.

In 1999, Metro-Goldwyn-Mayer acquired a 20% stake in the channel, which it subsequently sold back to Rainbow Media in 2001. NBC bought the network in 2002 for $1.25 billion; it had owned a stake in the channel and its sister networks for several years up to that point. NBC's then-parent company, General Electric, merged the network and its other broadcast and cable properties with Vivendi Universal Entertainment in May 2004 to form NBC Universal.

Bravo saw a massive success in 2003 with the reality series Queer Eye for the Straight Guy, which garnered 3.5 million viewers. The network began to add more reality shows to its lineup, some of them also very successful, including Project Runway in 2004, and Million Dollar Listing, The Real Housewives of Orange County and Top Chef, all in 2006. All spawned numerous spin-off shows, and some even turned into international franchises. The success of all these shows led Bravo to change its format from focusing on performing arts, drama, and independent film to being focused on reality series, pop culture, fashion and celebrities. In 2009, Entertainment Weekly put "Bravo reality shows" on its end-of-the-decade "best-of" list, saying, "From Queer Eye for the Straight Guy's Fab Five to Project Runway's fierce fashionistas to the kvetching, perma-tanned Real Housewives franchise, Bravo's quirky reality programming mixes high culture and low scruples to create deliciously addictive television."

A study released in May 2008 ranked Bravo as the brand most identified as gay-friendly among gay consumers. Bravo's age demographic is people 18–54, according to the Cable Television Advertising Bureau's cable television profiles.

Other successful reality series followed, including Shahs of Sunset (2012), Vanderpump Rules (2013), Married to Medicine (2013), Below Deck (2013), Southern Charm (2014), and Summer House (2017). Bravo's first ever scripted series, Girlfriends' Guide to Divorce, premiered in 2014 and ran until 2018.

On February 7, 2017, coinciding with the premiere of another scripted series, Imposters, Bravo updated its imaging with a refresh to its speech bubble-inspired logo, with the letters now all rendered in lowercase (replacing the wordmark text based on the logos used by the channel between 1994 and 2005), and a neutralized imaging to attract more male viewers. The "...by Bravo" marketing tag was also phased out from general use.

Programming

Bravo's programming schedule primarily includes originally produced programming, particularly reality content. Most popularly, the channel is known for its TV franchises The Real Housewives and Inside the Actors Studio, as well as Top Chef, Project Runway, Flipping Out, Below Deck, and Married to Medicine. The channel also airs reruns of series from parent network NBC and occasionally other NBCUniversal-owned networks, off-network series, including those from NBCUniversal Television Distribution, and feature films, primarily from the Universal Pictures catalog. Bravo utilizes block programming for both new shows and existing ones such as its "Fashion By Bravo" block.

Following its acquisition by NBC, Bravo began to supplement NBC Sports coverage of the Olympic Games, airing live events during the overnight and morning hours during the 2004 Summer Olympics; this coverage continued with the 2006 Winter Olympics. The channel carried no coverage during the 2008 games, as NBCUniversal had acquired Oxygen, allowing Bravo to continue to carry its regular programming schedule during NBC coverage of the Games. In 2012, the network served as the near-exclusive home for the Games's tennis tournament at Wimbledon, with up to 56 hours of coverage except for the men's and women's singles finals, which aired on NBC. During the 2016 Rio Olympics, Bravo served as the exclusive home of the entire tennis tournament.

Streaming
Bravo is associated with the Peacock streaming service where much of its original content can be found.

International versions
An Australian channel called Arena rebranded its on-air presentation in 2008 to align with Bravo as a result of an agreement with Bravo Media. Arena uses the now-former Bravo slogan "Watch What Happens" and has access to Bravo-produced programming. As of July 2020, the channel has rebranded with a new logo as Fox Arena and has added content from other providers such as WarnerMedia. In October 2022, it was announced that Australia's Seven Network would launch a local version of the network, titled 7Bravo on 15 January 2023, as part of a joint venture with NBCU.

A Canadian version of Bravo was launched in 1995 by CHUM Limited. The channel originally aired much of the same genres of programming aired by its American counterpart, though it has diverged to carry more dramatic programming rather than the American network's reality focus due to its compliance with its original remit from the Canadian Radio-television and Telecommunications Commission (CRTC) to air programming related to arts. Current owners Bell Media relaunched the channel in 2012, complete with the adoption of a new logo; there is now essentially no connection between the two channels other than a shared name. The channel carried the few arts-related series aired by the American version (such as Inside the Actors Studio and Work of Art), while Bravo's reality programs have been picked up by Corus Entertainment's Slice, Food Network Canada, HGTV Canada.

MediaWorks New Zealand announced that it would close the youth-oriented free to air channel Four in July 2016 and replace it with Bravo as part of a deal with NBC Universal. As of December 2020, the New Zealand channel is co-owned by Discovery, Inc.

A Brazilian version of Bravo was launched in 1996 by a partnership between TVA - then Grupo Abril's television arm -, TV Cultura and the original American network. The channel produced original programming like the Brazilian version of Inside Actors Studio called Studio Brasil. In August 1999, Bravo was rebranded as Film&Arts after Bravo Networks took the fully control of channel's administration. In 2000, Bravo Networks sold Film&Arts to Chellomedia's Pramer. AMC Networks acquired Chellomedia in 2014 putting Film&Arts in AMC International Networks' portfolio. As of 2016 the channel was no longer available in Brazil after being dropped out by several cable and satellite providers.

Bravo's A-List Awards 
In 2008, Bravo's A-List Awards were created to honor celebrities "who have made an unforgettable mark" in various fields of pop culture such as beauty, design, fashion, and cooking.

References

External links

English-language television stations in the United States
NBCUniversal networks
Television channels and stations established in 1980
Television networks in the United States